Yellow Cab Pizza Co. is a pizza restaurant chain based in the Philippines. Founded in April 2001 by Eric Puno, Henry Lee and Albert Tan, Yellow Cab Pizza is owned by Max's Group, who is also the owner of the restaurant fried chicken chain Max's Restaurant. The chain currently operates 159 branches in the Philippines and numbers in overseas, including branches in Qatar, United Arab Emirates, Saudi Arabia, Singapore, China, Vietnam and Oman.

Overview

The first branch of Yellow Cab Pizza Co. opened along Makati Avenue in Makati in April 2001. Because of having "yellow cab" in its name, many people thought of the chain as a taxi business, but the name is actually a reference to the way it frequently uses the colors black and yellow, a pattern seen on New York City taxicabs.
The company's delivery service uses Vespa scooters.

In addition, Yellow Cab formerly operates a sister restaurant called Army Navy Burger Burrito. The latter was not included in the sale of Yellow Cab to Max's Group, and has spun off as a separate company.

Expansion
In November 2016, Max's Group Inc. (MGI), owner of the Yellow Cab Pizza brand, signed a development agreement deal with the Qatar-based franchise operator Silver Group to open 22 stores in Kuwait, Bahrain and Oman over the coming five years, beginning in January 2017. The agreement is the seventh overseas franchise contract signed by MGI in 2016.

In January 2017, the first Yellow Cab Pizza restaurant opened in the USA. The restaurant, with an address of 801 Dillingham Boulevard at Alakawa Street, Honolulu, Hawaii, is located in a small strip center that's part of the Costco Iwilei complex, and is next to a Max's Restaurant.

In February 2017, MGI signed a development agreement with the Blue Star Food Corporation in Vietnam to establish at least 12 Yellow Cab stores around the country.

Involvement in sports

Motorsports
Yellow Cab Pizza also sponsors a team that participates in auto racing. Members of the team include actor Ryan Agoncillo and Alex Perez, who has won three racing titles. One of the chain's founders, Eric Puno, is a fan of racing.

They endorse contestants in motorcycle racing. Among them is Glenn Aguilar, an 11-time national champion.

Involvement in football
Yellow Cab Pizza is also one of the sponsors of United Football League Division 1 Club Kaya F.C. Members of the club are Azkals players Alexander Borromeo, Chris Greatwich, OJ Porteria, and Kenshiro Daniels.

Lawsuit
In 2008, Yellow Cab Pizza filed a suit against Green Cab Pizza Haus (later Green Avenue Pizza) for using a logo very similar to theirs.

References

External links

Restaurants established in 2001
Fast-food chains of the Philippines
Pizza chains of the Philippines
Pizza franchises
Companies based in Makati